Stella Jane Young (24 February 1982 – 6 December 2014) was an Australian comedian, journalist and disability rights activist.

Early life and education
Young was born in 1982 at Stawell, Victoria. She was born with osteogenesis imperfecta, and used a wheelchair for most of her life. At the age of 14 she audited the accessibility of the main street businesses of her hometown.

She held a Bachelor of Arts in Journalism and Public Relations from Deakin University, Geelong and a Graduate Diploma in Education from the University of Melbourne. After graduating in 2004, she worked for a time as a secondary school teacher.

Career

Young served as the editor for the Australian Broadcasting Corporation's online magazine Ramp Up. Before joining the ABC, she had worked as an educator in public programs at Melbourne Museum, and hosted eight seasons of No Limits, a disability culture program on community television station Channel 31.

In a Ramp Up editorial published in July 2012 she deconstructed society's habit of turning disabled people into what she called "inspiration porn", the idea that disabled people can do certain things "in spite" of their disability and are used to motivate non-disabled people, rather than uplifting disabled people. The concept was further popularized in her April 2014 TEDxSydney talk, titled "I'm not your inspiration, thank you very much".

Having previously appeared in several comedy showcases and group shows, Stella made her festival debut as a solo performer at the 2014 Melbourne International Comedy Festival. Her show Tales from the Crip, directed by Nelly Thomas, won her the award for best newcomer at the festival.

She was a member of the boards of the Ministerial Advisory Council for the Department of Victorian Communities, Victorian Disability Advisory Council,  the Youth Disability Advocacy Service and Women with Disabilities Victoria.

In 2017 Young was inducted posthumously onto the Victorian Honour Roll of Women in recognition of her work as a "journalist, comedian, feminist and fierce disability activist".

Bibliography

Contributed chapter 
 "The politics of exclusion", pp. 246–256, in: Destroying the joint, edited by Jane Caro, Read How You Want (2015).

Death 
Young died unexpectedly in Melbourne, on 6 December 2014 of a suspected aneurysm.

References

External links
StellaYoung.com

1982 births
2014 deaths
21st-century Australian women writers
21st-century Australian journalists
Australian disability rights activists
Australian feminist writers
Australian people with disabilities
Australian women comedians
Australian women journalists
Deakin University alumni
People with osteogenesis imperfecta
People from Victoria (Australia)
University of Melbourne alumni
Wheelchair users